Rashidi Boucher (born 17 July 1990) is a West Indian cricketer. He made his first-class debut for Barbados national cricket team in the 2008–09 Regional Four Day Competition on 30 January 2009.

He played his List A cricket debut for West Indies under-19 cricket team in the 2007-08 KFC Cup on 17 October 2007. He made his Twenty20 debut for Barbados national cricket team in the Caribbean T20 on 21 January 2011.

References

External links
 

1990 births
Living people
Barbadian cricketers
Barbados cricketers